Triei is a comune (municipality) of about 1,000 inhabitants in the province of Nuoro in the Italian region Sardinia, located about  northeast of Cagliari and about  north of Tortolì.

Triei borders the following municipalities: Baunei, Lotzorai, Talana, Urzulei.

History
The name "Triei" appears for the first time in a 1316 document, when it was part of the Giudicato of Cagliari. Later it was part of the Giudicato of Gallura, and then was under Pisa, the Aragonese (1323), Spain (1479), Austria (1708) and Piedmont (1720).

In the Osono plateau existed once the village of Osono, known in 1217.

Main sights
The Nuraghe Tomb of the Giants (Tomba dei Giganti), discovered in 1989.
Church of San Cosma e Damiano (16th-17th centuries)

Demographic evolution

References

Cities and towns in Sardinia